The male Belgian national (association) football team has been under the supervision of 25 different permanent managers and two caretakers since 1910. Before 1910 and in 1919, a committee of the RBFA presided by Édouard de Laveleye selected the players. Initially supervised by foreigners, it would take until 1930 for team Belgium to be officially led by a Belgian (Hector Goetinck).

As of 1 December 2022, coach Roberto Martínez is the most successful (permanent) manager that Belgium has ever had in statistical terms, with an average of 2.26 points per match. 
He achieved third place at the 2018 World Cup and kept Belgium in the number one spot on the FIFA World Ranking for over three years. With this he outperformed 
the coach that previously brought Belgium successes at international tournament end stages, Guy Thys, who led his team to the 1980 European Championship final and six years later to the semi-finals of the World Cup in Mexico.

Managers

Footnotes

References

Belgium